Bolivia competed at the 2014 Summer Youth Olympics, in Nanjing, China from 16 August to 28 August 2014.

Athletics

Bolivia qualified one athlete.

Qualification Legend: Q=Final A (medal); qB=Final B (non-medal); qC=Final C (non-medal); qD=Final D (non-medal); qE=Final E (non-medal)

Boys
Track & road events

Beach Volleyball

Bolivia qualified a girls' team from their performance at the 2014 CSV Youth Beach Volleyball Tour.

Cycling

Bolivia qualified a girls' team based on its ranking issued by the UCI.

Team

Mixed Relay

Fencing

Bolivia was given a quota to compete by the tripartite committee.

Girls

Swimming

Bolivia qualified two swimmers.

Boys

Girls

References

2014 in Bolivian sport
Nations at the 2014 Summer Youth Olympics
Bolivia at the Youth Olympics